Sumé (meaning "where?" in Greenlandic) was a Greenlandic rock band considered the pioneers of Greenlandic rock music. They were formed in 1972 by singer, guitarist and composer Malik Høegh (born 1952), and guitarist, singer and composer Per Berthelsen. Their first record Sumut "where to?" was released in 1973 on the Danish Demos label and was purchased by 20 percent of the Greenlandic population becoming an important part of the Greenlandic movement for cultural independence of Denmark. The band was inspired by American rock, but sang in the Greenlandic language and their lyrics were progressive and critical of the Danish colonial power. In the song Nunaqarfiit they sang "It is time to live again as Inuit and not as Westerners". The cover of the 1973 record Sumut showed a reproduction of a 19th-century woodcut by Aron of Kangeq depicting an Inuit hunter killing a Norseman.

The band was dissolved in 1977 but they still perform occasionally, and in 1994 they released the record Persersume "Snowdrift".

2014 saw the premiere of the movie about the band, its English title was "Sumé: the sound of a revolution", directed by Inuk Silis Høegh.

Discography
Sumut (1973, Demos)
Inuit Nunaat (1974, Demos)
Sume (1977, ULO)
1973-76 (1988, ULO)
Persersume (1994, ULO)

References

Greenlandic musical groups
Greenlandic rock music groups
Musical groups established in 1972
Musical groups disestablished in 1977